"Grande amore" (English: Great love) is a song performed by Italian operatic pop trio Il Volo, and written by Francesco Boccia and Ciro "Tommy" Esposito.  The song won the Sanremo Music Festival 2015 and represented Italy in the Eurovision Song Contest 2015 where it won the televoting, came sixth with the juries and third overall. The song was also covered with releases in other languages.

Origin and recording

Composition
The song was written in 2003 by the singer Francesco Boccia, and composed by Ciro "Tommy" Esposito (member of the Italian band Il Giardino dei Semplici), with an idea to make it performed by classical music singers. It was performed by Boccia himself and proposed for Sanremo Music Festival in 2005, but it was rejected because it was considered too old-fashioned.

It was shelved for twelve years, and again proposed for the "Newcomers" section in the Sanremo Music Festival 2015, to be performed by duo Operapop (formed by Francesca Carli and Enrico Giovagnoli), but their participation was denied due to festival's age restriction. It was also proposed to be performed by Orietta Berti, who although praised the song, refused because she wasn't available to participate in the festival.

Carlo Conti, artistic director and main presenter of the 65th edition of the festival, was not satisfied with the first proposed song by the trio Il Volo, and after hearing the song "Grande amore", recommended to the song's editor Pasquale Mammaro (manager of Operapop) to contact manager Michele Torpedine and assign it to the operatic trio Il Volo.

Lyrics
The song lyrics were not supposed to be changed, but on the behalf and desires by the trio, two verses were changed; "regina dei giorni miei" (queen of my days) became "respiro dei giorni miei" (breath of my days), and "sotto al tuo portone" (under your doorway) became "senza più timore" (without more fear). The lyrics were changed because as the original version refers to the serenade singing by a lover under the balcony to his lady, the trio felt it was too old style for their young age.

The song is not addressed to an actual person, but it's an idea of declaration of always valid love.

Song contests

Sanremo Music Festival
Il Volo performed the song for the first time during the 65th Sanremo Music Festival on 11 February 2015. During the final night of the song contest, held on 14 February 2015, "Grande amore" finished in first place, receiving 39.05% of votes on the last round of the competition, beating the remaining top three entries, Nek's "Fatti avanti amore" (35.38%) and Malika Ayane's "Adesso e qui (nostalgico presente)" (25.66%). According to the final voting results, Il Volo won mostly thanks to the televotes (40% of the final voting results share), receiving 56.1878% of votes, while only 22.9167% of votes by the experts jury (3rd), and 32.3333% of votes by the popular jury (2nd).

During Il Volo's performances, the Sanremo Festival Orchestra was directed by Carolina Bubbico.

Eurovision Song Contest
On 19 February 2015, Italian broadcaster RAI confirmed "Grande amore" as the song to be performed by Il Volo during the Eurovision Song Contest 2015.

Since Italy is part of the "Big Five", Il Volo automatically qualified for the final of the competition in Vienna, Austria, on 23 May 2015, where they performed as the last song in the running order. The song came first on televoting and third overall. It also won the Marcel Bezençon Press Award for Best Song, awarded by the accredited international press.

Personnel
 Celso Valli - Arrangements, production, orchestra conductor, piano, keyboards
 Mattia Tedesco - guitars 
 Cesare Chiodo - electric bass 
 Paolo Valli - drums 
 Stefano Bussoli - timpani

Covers
Il Volo released a Spanish-language version on 10 July 2015.

Charts and certifications

Weekly charts

Year-end charts

Certifications

References

2014 songs
2015 singles
Eurovision songs of 2015
Eurovision songs of Italy
Il Volo songs
Sanremo Music Festival songs
Number-one singles in Greece
Sony Music singles